This is a list of characters in Twin Princess of Wonder Planet.

Sunny Kingdom

Age: 8 (1st series), 9 (2nd series)
Fine is one of the main protagonists of the series and one of the twin princesses of Sunny Kingdom. She has red hair and eyes which were inherited from her mother. Fine is referred to as one of "the most unprincess-like princesses in the history of Fushigi-boshi". She is a glutton for food, especially cake despite having terrible cooking skills. She frequently whines whenever she sees or hears anything supernatural because she does not like horror. She and Rein help each other out the most. Fine is athletic but not a good dancer. She is friendly and tries to stay happy in any situation. Fine is very naive but is always the type to do anything to help her friends, causing Noche to fall for her. She tries to cheer people up despite not knowing the entire situation and does not express herself more often, trying to brush off the feelings she hides. Fine can understand what Shade's little sister, Milky, is saying because they both like to eat. Fine is the first to trust Eclipse (Shade) and slowly falls in love with him. She never really knew that Shade was in love with Rein or how Bright liked her. Likewise, she never figured out that Noche was in love with her. She showed some jealously in situations where Shade paid more attention to Rein like saving her rather than Fine. Her favorite color is Red/Pink. Later in the anime, when they get to know each other better, she becomes Shade's love interest and is still in love with him in the second season. (note: Fine and Rein never won a single princess party...) In the manga, she ends up with Bright and becomes the future Queen of Sunny Kingdom.

Age: 8 (1st series), 9 (2nd series)
Rein is the other main protagonist of the series and the other twin princess of Sunny Kingdom. She has sea-green eyes and blue hair which were inherited from her father. Although Rein is also referred to as one of "the most unprincess-like princesses in the history of Fushigi-boshi", she likes to dress up and wear elaborate decorations. Rein gets eccentric when it comes to romance and helps anyone in need. She is better at dancing than Fine. She is also a bad cook like Fine. Even though Rein likes Bright, she had no idea that Eclipse/Shade has a crush on her. But Rein did realize that Bright cared for Fine more than her before. She is seriously jealous when Prince Bright pays more attention on Fine (her twin sister). She also never figured out Fango had a crush on her like Noche to her twin sister. One of her big traits is that she is a big daydreamer, for she fantasizes about her romance with Bright. She's adventurous, but is also friendly, eccentric and caring, which caused Fango to have a crush on her. Rein often thinks positive and intelligent ways to fix things which is why Fine depends on Rein with ideas. She is also good at solving other people's problems and becomes Royal Wonder Academy's news reporter. Her favorite color is blue. In the anime, she becomes Bright's main love interest and is still in love with him in the second season. In the manga, she ends up with Shade and becomes the future Queen of Moon Kingdom.

A fairy-like creature to which Fine and Rein treats as their pet. He also ends his sentences with "pumo". Poomo helps Fine and Rein on their mission to save their planet. He is also shown to have many abilities such as cooking, sewing and piloting. He almost died at the end of the first season but the last Grace stone and Princess Grace saved him, allowing him to live with Fine and Rein forever. He is also smitten by the Ballerina in the anime.

Grace is the legendary princess who once saved Fushigi-boshi in the ancient days. Although she died ages ago, she appears as an astral body inside the core of the Sun's blessing before she entrusts Fine and Rein in a mission to save the planet.

Camelot is one of Fine and Rein's maids. She can be very bossy in the beginning of the series, but has a caring and enthusiastic side to educate Fine and Rein to become more proper and decent princesses.

Lulu is a cat who serves as Camelot's trainee. She gives suggestions to Camelot in some cases and writes down comprehensive notes of Camelot's work. Lulu appears for the first time in the 11th episode.

Elsa is the queen of Sunny Kingdom and Fine and Rein's mother. She has a gentle and kind character. Fine and Rein admire her mostly because of the precious décors she made. Her hair and eyes are red (to which Fine inherited). She also cherishes the presents Fine and Rein gave her.

Truth is the king of Sunny Kingdom and Fine and Rein's father. His eyes are sea-green and his hair is blue (to which Rein inherited). It is revealed that he gave Dream Seed flowers to Elsa when he proposed to her. He is also very protective of Rein, as Fango pursues her.

Omendo is the laboratory scientist of Sunny Kingdom. He analyzes all of the climate data that are processed by the weather stations. He is childhood friends with Camelot.

Tabi and Jill are some of the workers of the weather station. In the 4th episode, Fine and Rein help Tabby out because of his overwork while Jill is very worried about him.

Moon Kingdom

Shade is the prince of the Moon Kingdom and Milky's older brother. He appears as Eclipse during the beginning of the series. His whip attacks are identified the same as Eclipse. Whenever Shade goes out, he normally dresses up as Eclipse. He was obsessed with the power of the Prominence because it had the ability to save Fushigiboshi. He knew about the blessing of the sun weakening. He has a mysterious but serious aura around him in the first season but turns to be very kind. Shade is very smart. He helped the twin princesses in the first season. His mother Moon Malia is very sick and he cares for her with his whole heart. It is because of her that he aspires to be a doctor. He has a pet dragon named Regina. He also gained a very brotherly relationship with Bright. At first, he seems like he doesn't like anything because of his cold attitude but he had a crush on Rein. However once he got to know the twin princesses better, he fell in love with Fine who never actually believed he was a bad person. His role became minor in the second season but he still protected Fine and her friends whenever he could, even having to be hurt to save her and his friends. He ends up with Fine in the anime and Rein in the manga.

Milky is the princess of the Moon Kingdom and Shade's younger sister. She's a toddler that can travel around places (by sitting on her floating star). Milky is more likely to have trouble communicating people with her "Babu" babbling, but people like Shade and Fine can understand what she means. She is also gluttonous like Fine, and often eats up all of the food before Fine can reach it. She likes Narlo.

Regina is Shade's pet dragon that he used to travel to all the countries.

Moon Malia is the queen of the Moon Kingdom and Shade and Milky's mother. Her mood and health is measured by the aurora waves floating in the sky. She is usually sick. She is very fond of Rein in the manga.

Chuuba is a very accurate rat fortune teller.

Monmon Golem is the beast that sleeps deep inside the temple. At certain times of the year, he wakes up and blows the obscuring clouds away from the moon to allow moonlight into the Moon Kingdom. Momon Golem also haves different tastes than ordinary humans because he can eat Fine and Rein's cooking and even called it delicious.

Queen Scorpion is a very big scorpion that comes only when her little scorpions get defeated. She is very sensitive to loud noises.

Mia is a local worker near the Star Lake.

Flame Kingdom
 (Lee-on-eh)

Age: 11 (1st series), 12 (2nd series)
Lione is the princess of the Flame Kingdom and Tio's older sister. She has orange-reddish hair and hazel-brown eyes. Lione is too personal and often takes thoughts deeply. Also, Lione is not very fond of dancing, but she knows how to samba. She even knows how to cheer Tio up. Lione has some useful skills like driving and being able to tell how Bo Dragon is feeling. In the manga it is shown that she is most closest with Rein than all the other princesses of Fushigi Boshi

Note: It is shown that Lione did Samba dancing for the first time at the annual Samba party the 32nd episode.
Note: It is shown that Lione was using a special stone/gem to see how Bo Dragon was feeling in the 3rd episode.

Lione is a gentle princess who's caring and sweet. She is shy and sometimes nervous, but she is never afraid to try. Also, she is very loyal to her kingdom and would do anything to save it. She has reddish-orange hair and hazel-brown eyes. Lione loves Flame Kingdom as much as she loves her friends, Princesses Rein and Fine of Sunny Kingdom. She is half lion and half human.

Age: 9 (1st series), 10 (2nd series)

Tio is the prince of the Flame Kingdom and Lione's brother. He likes to play with his katana (saber). Tio often makes appearances  because he tries to save Fine and Rein from trouble. He always fails every time he saves the twin princesses. He sees Shade as his hero and asked Shade to be his assistant.

Wohl is the king of the Flame Kingdom and Lione and Tio's father. He is very dynamic and his excitement is emphasized by the torches in the throne room.

Nina is the queen of the Flame Kingdom and Lione and Tio's mother.

Howan is a cook and a manager of a Chinese-style restaurant in the Flame Kingdom. The special‐feature menu of his restaurant is Flaming Hot Fried Rice (Heramera Chaofan).

Bo Dragon is an extremely large dragon living inside the volcano. When Bo Dragon is sick, he coughs volcanic ashes.

 
Thunderbolt is a creature with two flame tails. When Shade rides on Regina, Tio rides on him. He is sometimes incompetent with Tio. Thunderbolt's best appetite is Poomo.

Water Drop Kingdom

 Age 10 (first series), 11 (second series)
Mirlo is the princess of the Water Drop Kingdom. She is a shy and soft-spoken girl who does not wish to offend others, so she tends to go with what others say, especially her mother. In the original concept and series, Mirlo is a talented artist and often shown painting landscapes of the castle and the city and countryside surrounding it. She also takes care of her younger brother, Narlo, often.

She won the Best Sports Princess Party in spite of her lack of athleticism thanks to her sportsmanship and helping get the contest back on track after the fight between Altezza and Sophie. She was going to marry Estevan, the young son of wealthy businessman, in order to get the funds to fix the Drop Kingdom's cloud making machinery, but Fine and Rein exposed it as a plot by Roman to install a puppet on the throne. Mirlo admits she is not ready to marry, but the businessman will help pay for the repairs anyway. Although she usually acquiesces to her mother, she found the courage to tell her to spend more time with Narlo.

In the second series, she received an anonymous love letter that turned out to be from Pastel, the prince of the Art Planet, before he had to leave to tend to his ailing father.

Mirlo is a much different character in the manga. A vain and spoiled girl, she causes trouble for Fine and Rein. While it appeared she was meant to a primary adversary for the twins, she disappeared after the third chapter until a brief appearance in the final chapter.

There was some confusion as to how Mirlo's name is to be spelled in English. In the show, it was spelled Mirlo in one instance and Milro in another. Similarly, the first Character Detail Book spelled it Mirlo and the second Milro.

Age: 1
Narlo is the prince of the Water Drop Kingdom and Mirlo's baby brother. He is about the same age as Milky.

After the events at the Flame Kingdom's New Years Talent Show, he began to call for his mom by yelling "Gabin!!" ("Gabin" means "Oh my GOSH!" in Japanese.) Both Bright and the Twins tried to break him of the habit, but got him halfway to "Ma-bin".

Nalro seems to have a crush on Milky and starts riding with her on her star.

Unlike Mirlo/Milro, Narlo's name has been spelled consistently in English in show-related material.

Yamul is the queen of the Water Drop Kingdom and Mirlo and Narlo's mother. She is often busy running her kingdom, sequestered in her office to do paperwork. She even takes audiences in her office as often as the throne room. She is very strict and firm and wants Mirlo to behave like a proper princess. However, she loves her children and appreciates when Mirlo speaks up on behalf of Narlo when he feels ignored.

Pump is the king of the Water Drop Kingdom and Mirlo and Narlo's father.

Ada and Ida are twin sisters living on the outskirts of a village in the Water Drop Kingdom's swamps. They fish in the swamps and share some of their catch with the local birds. However, the Blessing of the Sun weakening causes the water temperature to drop and their catches got smaller. Looking to sew unrest, Bright and Boomo tell them they can get food by impersonating Fine and Rein and threaten to curse anyone who refuses to hand over the food for free. When the two are discovered, the villagers forgive them since it was for taking care of the birds.

Esteban is the boy that Mirlo was supposed to marry. However, it was a scheme by Roman as his tutor was spoiling him to make him simple minded and easy to control. When the conspiracy is thwarted, Esteban says he does not know what marriage is. While the marriage is called off, he and Mirlo continue to be friends.

Seed Kingdom

It is hard to tell who is who because they all look alike with the exception of the hair color. From the Futago Hime Character Detail book (CDB), the seed princesses names are Ichele, Nina, Saya, Shiyon, Gorchel, Loloa, Nursya, Harney, Quarry, Julia, and Joiner. Their names are subtly related to numbers from one to eleven in Japanese.

Age: 8 (1st series), 9 (2nd series)

Solo is the prince of the Seed Kingdom and the 11 Seed Princesses' brother. In birthday's original concept, Solo is a talented violin player.

The king of the Seed Kingdom (the 11 Seed Princesses and Solo's father) is completely against the monkey's invasion. He is, however, very impatient and never gives people a chance to finish what they are saying.

Flower is the Queen of the Seed Kingdom and the 11 Seed Princesses and Solo's mother.

Snowy is a strange creature in the forest that creates mystical visions.

Jewelry Kingdom

Bright is the prince of the Jewelry Kingdom and Altezza's older brother. Although he and Shade are the same age, he is a real gentleman. At the start, he has a huge crush on Fine. His mood changes when he gets possessed by the power of darkness (from kind to evil). He believed he should have been the King of Fushigiboshi. In the middle of the series, Eclipse always takes his place when it comes to saving the twins. After Bright is freed from the power of darkness he and Shade start to get along like brothers. After being possessed, he moved on from Fine to Rein as she helped him to understand the most that he is best as the old Bright. He is in the fencing club at the Royal Wonder Academy. His role becomes minor like Shade's in the second season but he still steps in to save Rein and his friends like Shade. Bright's main love interest in the manga is Fine. He becomes the future King of Sunny Kingdom.

Age: 11(1st series), 12 (2nd series)

Altezza is the princess of the Jewelry Kingdom and Bright's younger sister. Unlike other princesses, she aggravates easily. Altezza often yells at people (such as Sophie) and gets mad when something that she wants never gets done. She also likes to show off. A good thing about her is how she really cares for her brother, Bright. She is admired by Prince Auler. Altezza would do anything to win a competition at a Princess Party, no matter what. In the second season she seems to have gotten closer to Auler.

Aaron is the king of the Jewelry Kingdom and Altezza and Bright's father.

Camelia is the queen of the Jewelry Kingdom and Altezza and Bright's mother. She is very dramatic and faints when something bad happens. Altezza might have inherited her personality because she also shows off, but cares for Bright and Altezza deeply.

Ms. Butterfly is a local jewelry maker. She is interested in elaborate designs. Her main competitor is Sirius.

Sirius (also known as Serias) is another jewelry maker. Unlike Ms. Butterfly, his mother has worked with Fine and Rein's mother, Elsa, in the past. He is not too obsessed in elaborate designs, but puts his heart into all of the jewelry he makes.

Puppet is a moveable-type doll that lives in the junkyard at a nearby amusement park called "Doll Town". She hopes that her real owner retrieves her.

Windmill Kingdom

Sophie is the princess of the Windmill Kingdom and Auler's sister. She and Altezza may have a bad relationship, but they are friends. They are the members of "losers' club", according to Sophie, but they were friends after all. She is soft-spoken and likes flowers. She irritates people with her overly uncaring attitude towards important things. She had a small windmill that plays a tune and can control the winds in her kingdom. She often has "slow moments"

Auler is the prince of the Windmill Kingdom and Sophie's brother. He has a crush on Altezza.

Randa is the king of the Windmill Kingdom and Sophie and Auler's father.

Elena is the queen of the Windmill Kingdom and Sophie and Auler's mother

Sea Kingdom

Age: 7-8

Pearl is the princess of the unknown country, Sea Kingdom. She lives with her friends, but not her parents. Her parents rarely visit her because they attend government affairs. However, they love her as much as she does. She has a very beautiful singing voice.

Unclassified

Naginyo is a spirit sent by Princess Grace to lookout for Fine and Rein. He puts most prized possession is his harp (which he calls it a violin) as he often plays it to entertain ladies. Fine and Rein find his harp playing skills slightly annoying, but his lyrics actually tell the truth of things. He has green hair and green eyes. If you look at his clothes it has each embel of each Kingdom

Nacchi is a trapeze performer in a circus. Being the star of the show, her trapeze act is the main attraction for the circus. After Nacchi suffered an injury, she lost her guts. Luckily, Fine and Rein are there to help her.

Enemies 

Roman is a former Moon Chancellor of the Moon Kingdom. His main goal to steal the Prominence and use it for himself. After being unsuccessful, he gets sucked into the dark void.

 & 

Rau and Yan are two of Roman's henchmen. Their goal is to analyze and steal the power of the Prominence for Roman. They also appear in the second series. (Helper of the Vice-President)

Boomo is the dark version of Poomo. He often leads many evil activities but gets crazy sometimes. Boomo was originally good, but turned evil when he wanted to be the king of other Poomos. It is also common to find Boomo doing strange activities. He had a crush on Princess Pearl in Sea Kingdom (Unknown Kingdom).

Black Crystal King is the ultimate enemy. It is the original source for all the powers of darkness. It also controls what Bright does, forcing him to use the Prominence when someone disobeys him. Although the Black Crystal does not walk by itself, it can expand rapidly. The fuel for it are the people's sadness. However, that Black Crystal King was an imposter, while the real one only appears in the Gyu! series.

Fushigiboshi no Futago Hime Gyu! 

Note: In the sequel, characters from the previous series come along with new characters.

 & 

Age: 12

Sasha and Carla are special friends of Planet Celeb. They follow Elizabetta and help make her introduction grand and are used to do the difficult tasks for her.

Age: 13

Elizabetta is  the princess of Planet Celeb. Acting like an idol, she is very ignorant of other people. Elizabetta talks monotonously like an old woman. When it comes to doing hard tasks, Sasha and Carla do it for her. She confessed to Fango by giving him chocolates in episode 45.

Age: 12
Chiffon is the princess of Planet Mathematics. At the age of 6 she is a brainchild of education. Chiffon is well known for earning the most points at school. After she meets Fine and Rein, she starts "observing" them and is constantly calling them "Fushigi" (Mysterious) and addressing them as "Fushigi Hime" (Mysterious Princesses). She loves Toma.

Age: 14

Toma is the prince of Planet Wulpurgis. Being the first person to be possessed by Edward, he makes different beasts with his powers in order to destroy the fun. Later in the series, he hides a very powerful portrait of Edward behind secret corridors. Toma might have develop some feelings for Chiffon.

Age: 11

Noche is the prince of Planet Orchestra. He enjoys playing music on his violin and frequently cries in many events. He has a crush on Fine. His father once forced Fine to marry him on 42nd episode (in the 2nd series), but they didn't marry due to Noche's disagreement for Fine. In the end of the 2nd season he gets jealous that Fine is dancing with Shade.

Age: 11

March is the princess of Planet Morals. She spies on Fine and Rein and deducts points for their wrongdoing.

Age: 11-12

Fango is the prince of Planet Gretel. He appears quite reserved, doesn't talk to people and is known to get in trouble. He is good at martial arts. At first, he have a crush on Rein (which makes Shade, Bright and King Truth anxious) but later also started noticing Elizabetta after she gave him chocolates in episode 45.

Age: 11

Lemon is the princess of Planet Naniwan. Her most prized possession is the Golden Fan because she can use it to do many amusing tricks that no one else can do. Injuries from her tricks are unknown.

Age: 14

Melon is the prince of Planet Naniwan. He is Lemon's brother and helps her understand the accident she had before. He seems to somewhat like Princess Sophie.

 & 

Kyukyu and PyuPyu are Angels from the Soilel Bell. They activate Fine and Rein's magic. Though, they're only toddlers, they cause numerous troubles anywhere for Fine and Rein including property damage and costing them Points.

Bibin is the princess from the Black Planet who attends at the mysterious Black Academy, she was entrusted by the also mysterious Black Principal to gather "Unhappy Fruits" which are needed for her graduation as a really evil queen. 
She revives Edward and nickname him as Edochin, however rather than reviving him with his original form, she revives him with a hybrid between pig and bunny who have the ability of flying, but none of his original powers.
Bibin and Edochin frequently causes trouble, however their plans always ends in a failure thanks to Fine and Rein constant interference.

Also known as the Vice-Principal, favors Elizabetta frequently by doing everything that would benefit her. He is impolite to Fine and Rein due to their childish behaviour. He is the ex-minister of the Moon Kingdom during the 1st series.

Tanba Rin is the instructor at the Royal Wonder Academy. She is relatively small compared to everyone else, including her students. Her name is a play on the musical instrument "tambourine".

Ban Jo is also the instructor at the Royal Wonder Academy. His method of teaching includes yelling. He has a crush on Tanba Rin. His name is a play on the musical instrument "banjo".

Hiruzu is the prince of Planet Gorgeous.

External links 
 - Character profiles to the residents of the Flame Kingdom. This page is in Japanese.
 - A page to the weekly of the Flame Kingdom. This page also features stories, how the kingdom was made and about the Flame Kingdom's past days and years.
 - Character profiles to the residents of the Water Drop Kingdom. This page is in Japanese.
 - A page to the weekly of the Water Drop Kingdom. This page also features stories, how the kingdom was made and about the Water Drop Kingdom's past days and years.
  - The character profiles to the residents of the Seed Kingdom. This page is in Japanese.
  - The weekly page to the Seed Kingdom. Also includes stories, how the kingdom was made, the kingdom's past days and years, Solo making music on one of the pages of the weekly and how they got Coco.
 - Character profiles to the residents of the Windmill Kingdom. This page is in Japanese.
 - A page to the Windmill Kingdom. This page also features stories, how the kingdom was made and about the Windmill Kingdom's past days and years.

References 

Fushigiboshi no Futagohime